Hanak District is a district of Ardahan Province of Turkey. Its seat is the town Hanak. Its area is 647 km2, and its population is 8,418 (2021).

Composition
There is one municipality in Hanak District:
 Hanak

There are 26 villages in Hanak District:

 Altınemek
 Arıkonak
 Aşağıaydere
 Baştoklu
 Binbaşak
 Börk
 Çatköy
 Çavdarlı
 Çayağzı
 Çiçeklidağ
 Çimliçayır
 Dilekdere
 Geç
 Güneşgören
 İncedere
 Karakale
 Koyunpınarı
 Oğuzyolu
 Sazlıçayır
 Serinkuyu
 Sevimli
 Sulakçayır
 Yamaçyolu
 Yamçılı
 Yukarıaydere
 Yünbüken

References

Districts of Ardahan Province